Net (stylized as NET) is a 2021 Indian Telugu-language thriller drama film written and directed by debutant Bhargav Macharla. It is produced by Surya Rahul Tamada and Saideep Reddy Borra of Tamada Media. The film stars Rahul Ramakrishna, Avika Gor, Praneetha Patnaik and Vishwadev Rachakonda. It premiered on the streaming service ZEE5 on 10 September 2021.

Plot
The plot revolves around a youngster in the cyber world. He gets trapped in the events around cybercrimes. Every moment in life is being monitored and used by strangers.

Cast 
 Rahul Ramakrishna as Lakshman
 Avika Gor as Priya
 Praneetha Patnaik as Suchitra
 Vishwadev Rachakonda as Ranjith
 Vishnu Oi
 Dakshi Guutikonda
 Shoban Chitraprolu
 Amulya Mende
 Harishchandra
 Anthony Som

Production 
The film marks the feature film debut of director Bhargav Macharla. Macharla wrote the script after studying data leaks and privacy breaches. Net was initially planned as a six-episode web series, but was later made as a direct-to-video film for ZEE5. Macherla cast Ramakrishna as he wanted someone who would look like a "regular guy in the neighbourhood" while Patnaik was signed after watching her performance in C/o Kancharapalem, as Macharla felt she could pull of a character in a realistic setting.

Reception 
In her review for The Hindu, Sangeetha Devi Dundoo called the film a "telling tale of online voyeurism." Praising the performances of Ramakrishna, Patnaik and Gor, Dundoo wrote, "NET could have been a full-fledged tech thriller had it looked at a crackdown on cybercrime, but it stays content in being a human drama, and leaving us with uneasy questions on privacy breach." Sravan Vanaparthy of The Times of India rated the film 3.5 stars out of 5 and stated: "Director Bhargav Macharla puts forward a good film in NET that tells the story in a natural and convincing manner."

Cinema Express critic Ram Venkat Srikar felt that the film was more of a tale of voyeurism than a surveillance thriller. He concluded his review saying: "NET is a self-aware attempt that works more as a drama than a thriller. A brilliant performance from Rahul Ramakrishna and the straightforward treatment makes it one of the better films of the year." Praveen Kumar Vadla of News18 Telugu also praised the writing and performances, in addition to the technical aspects.

References

External links 

 
 NET on ZEE5

2021 thriller drama films
2020s Telugu-language films
Indian thriller drama films
2021 directorial debut films
2021 direct-to-video films
ZEE5 original films
Films about pornography
Films about cybercrime
Films set in Hyderabad, India
Films set in Telangana
Films shot in Hyderabad, India
Indian direct-to-video films
Indian crime thriller films
Films about technological impact